The 2009–10 Turkish Ice Hockey Super League season was the 18th season of the Turkish Ice Hockey Super League, the top level of ice hockey in Turkey. Six teams participated in the league.

Regular season

Playoffs

Semifinals 
 Ankara Üniversitesi Spor Kulübü - Kocaeli Büyükşehir Belediyesi Kağıt Spor Kulübü 7:2
 Başkent Yıldızları Spor Kulübü - Polis Akademisi ve Koleji 8:1

3rd place
 Kocaeli Büyükşehir Belediyesi Kağıt Spor Kulübü - Polis Akademisi ve Koleji 6:8

Final 
 Ankara Üniversitesi Spor Kulübü - Başkent Yıldızları Spor Kulübü 7:3

External links 
 Turkish Ice Hockey Federation

Turk
Turkish Ice Hockey Super League seasons
TBSHL